Hexasterophora are a subclass of sponges, in the class Hexactinellida. The Hexasterophora first appeared in the Ordovician and is separated into five recent orders, including the Lyssacinosa, the Hexactinosa, and the Lychniscosa, all of which have living representatives in the seas today.

Hexasterophorans have skeletons composed of overlapping six-rayed spicules. The sponge is commonly firmly attached by its base to a hard substratum; less often rooted by the anchoring spicules and rarely inserted directly into the loose bottom sediments. The three groups are differentiated by the extent of fusion of adjacent spicules.

The Lyssacinosa, Hexactinosa, and Lychniscosa appear sequentially in the fossil record. The least fused group, the Lyssacinosa, appears in the Ordovician, while the intermediate group, the Hexactinosa is known from the Devonian. Finally, the Lychniscosa, with the most tightly interlocking spicules is first found in rocks of Triassic age.

References

Hexactinellida
Sponge subclasses